Cornish Creek is a former rural locality in the Barcaldine Region, Queensland, Australia.

On 22 November 2019 the Queensland Government decided to amalgamate the localities in the Barcaldine Region, resulting in five expanded localities based on the larger towns: Alpha, Aramac, Barcaldine, Jericho and Muttaburra. Most of Cornish Creek was incorporated into Muttaburra, except for a small part of eastern Cornish Creek which was incorporated into Aramac.

Geography 
The Thomson River forms the south-western boundary of the locality. Cornish Creek flows through the locality from east (Upper Cornish Creek) to west (Tablederry) where it becomes a tributary to the Thomson River. All watercourses in the locality flow into the Lake Eyre drainage basin.

The Muttaburra Aramac Road enters the locality from the west (Muttaburra) and passes through the locality exiting to the south (Sardine). Crossmoor Road enters the locality from the south-west (Muttaburra) and has its junction with the Muttaburra Aramac Road within the locality.

The principal land use is grazing.

History 
Cornish Creek is part of the traditional tribal lands of the Iningai. Iningai (also known as Yiningay, Muttaburra, Tateburra, Yinangay, Yinangi) is an Australian Aboriginal language spoken by the Iningai people. The Iningai language region includes the landscape within the local government boundaries of the Longreach Region and Barcaldine Region, particularly the towns of Longreach, Barcaldine, Muttaburra and Aramac as well as the properties of Bowen Downs and catchments of Cornish Creek and Alice River.

The locality is named after the creek, which was in turn named in 1860 by explorer William Landsborough after his business partner Edward Cornish.

Heritage listings 
Cornish Creek has a number of heritage-listed sites, including:
 Mount Cornish Homestead

Education 
The nearest primary schools are in Muttaburra and Aramac. The nearest secondary schools are in Aramac (to Year 10 only) and in Winton, Longreach and Barcaldine (all to Year 12).

References

Barcaldine Region
Unbounded localities in Queensland